Northampton Academy is a mixed secondary school and sixth form in Northampton, Northamptonshire for students aged 11 to 18. Since September 2004, it has been an Academy, part of United Learning, a subsidiary of the United Church Schools Trust (UCST). It includes STEM provision as well as Elite Sports Academies in both football and netball. The School moved from their old site utilizing both Lings Upper and Emanuel Middle school sites into their new, state of the art site in January 2006, where they have been located ever since.

Houses
There are five houses at the Academy, named after influential figures. These five houses represent two tutor groups each for every year group.
 Arnold – Malcolm Arnold, born in Northampton, was an English composer. In 2010, he lent his name to the Malcolm Arnold Academy.
 Doddridge – Philip Doddridge, born in London, a hymnwriter who was pastor of the former Castle Hill Congregational Chapel in Doddridge Street, after whom it is named.
 Dryden – John Dryden, born near Thrapston, was an English poet, literary critic, translator, and playwright who was made Poet Laureate in 1668.  Dryden Road is named after him.
 Spencer – Cynthia Spencer of Althorp, after whom Spencer House in Spencer Parade are named.
 Tull – Walter Tull, an inside forward for Tottenham Hotspur and Northampton Town, and the first Black commissioned infantry officer to serve in the British Army. Walter Tull Way is named after him.

As of September 2018, the five houses will cease to exist and each tutor group will be amalgamated into an individual letter system ranging from A-J, S.

Notable former pupils
Slowthai - Rapper
Chantelle Cameron - Professional boxer
Thakgalo Leshabela - Professional footballer for Leicester City
Benjamin Mensah - Professional footballer for Peterborough United

References

External links
 School homepage

Secondary schools in West Northamptonshire District
Academies in West Northamptonshire District
United Learning schools
2004 establishments in England
Educational institutions established in 2004